Neighbours is a long-running Australian television soap opera that was first broadcast on the Seven Network on 18 March 1985 and aired its final episode on 28 July 2022 on Network 10. The following is an alphabetical list of recurring characters and cast members that have appeared in the soap, separate from the list of regular characters. Recurring characters who later became regular characters are not included, neither are characters that were regular and returned as recurring.

A

B

C

D

E

F

G

H

I

J

K

L

M

N

O

P

Q

R

S

T

U

V

W

X

Y

Z

See also
List of regular Neighbours characters

References

External links
 Cast and characters at the Internet Movie Database

Lists of Neighbours characters